Franks Wild Years is the tenth studio album by Tom Waits, released 1987 on Island Records.  Subtitled "Un Operachi Romantico in Two Acts", the album contains songs written by Waits and collaborators (mainly his wife, Kathleen Brennan) for a play of the same name. The shared title of the album and the play is an iteration of "Frank's Wild Years", a song from Waits' 1983 album Swordfishtrombones.

The play had its world premiere at the Briar St. Theatre in Chicago, Illinois, on June 22, 1986, performed by the Steppenwolf Theatre Company.

Various versions of "Way Down in the Hole" were used as the theme music for the HBO series The Wire, including Waits' original version for the second season.  The songs "Temptation" and "Cold Cold Ground" were used in Jean-Claude Lauzon's film Léolo (1992). "Cold Cold Ground" was also used in the series Homicide: Life on the Street. "Temptation" and "Straight to the Top (Vegas)" featured in the film Enron: The Smartest Guys in the Room (2005), and "Innocent When You Dream" featured in the film Smoke (1995).
The song "If I Have to Go" was used in the play, but released only in 2006 on Orphans: Brawlers, Bawlers & Bastards. The theme from "If I Have to Go" was used under the title "Rat's Theme" in the documentary Streetwise as early as 1984. "Yesterday Is Here" appears in "The Night Shift", the second episode of the 2023 mystery drama series Poker Face.

Chart information

Track listing

Note: "Cold Cold Ground" is incorrectly listed as "Cold Call Ground" on the Island CD release.

Personnel
Credits adapted from the album liner notes.

Musicians
 Jay Anderson – bass (8)
 Michael Blair – drums, conga, percussion, maracas, marimba, orchestra bells, glockenspiel (1–4, 6, 10–14)
 Kathleen Brennan – vocal arrangements (4)
 Angela Brown – background vocals (11)
 Ralph Carney – saxophone, baritone horn, violin, tenor saxophone (1–2, 4–6, 8, 10–13, 17)
 Greg Cohen - bass, alto horn, horn arrangements, Leslie bass pedals (1–6, 10–14, 16–17)
 David Hidalgo – accordion (15–16)
 Leslie Holland – background vocals (11)
 Lynne Jordan – background vocals (11)
 Marc Ribot – guitar, banjo (1, 4, 11, 14)
 William Schimmel – piano, pump organ, accordion, Leslie bass pedals, cocktail piano (1, 2, 5–6, 10, 12–13, 17)
 Larry Taylor – bass, upright bass (2, 7, 8, 15)
 Moris Tepper – guitar (4, 6, 10, 14)
 Francis Thumm – prepared piano, pump organ (3, 10)
 Tom Waits – vocals, pump organ, Optigan, guitar, vocal stylings, rooster, piano, Farfisa, Mellotron, drums, conga, tambourine
 Izzy Stradlin – unconfirmed appearance on rhythm guitar
Technical
 Tchad Blake –  additional engineer
 Biff Dawes – engineer, mixing (at Sunset Sound, Hollywood, California)
 Lorita Delacerna – additional engineer
 David Glover – additional engineer
 Bill Higley – additional engineer
 Mike Kloster – additional engineer
 David Knight – additional engineer 
 Danny Leake – engineer
 Jean-Baptiste Mondino – conception, photography
 Jeff Price – art direction
 Stephen Shelton – additional engineer 
 Tom Waits – producer
 Howie Weinberg – mastering

Critical reception
The album ranked number 5 among "Albums of the Year" for 1987 in the annual NME critics' poll.

References

External links
 Frank's Wild Years at the Steppenwolf Theatre Company
 Franks Wild Years (album) and Frank's Wild Years (theatrical), info at the Tom Waits Library

Tom Waits albums
Tom Waits soundtracks
1987 albums
Island Records albums